The Electric Light Orchestra (ELO) are  an English rock band from Birmingham. Formed in 1971, the group's original lineup included songwriters/multi-instrumentalists Jeff Lynne and Roy Wood and drummer Bev Bevan. Currently Jeff Lynne and keyboardist Richard Tandy are the only official members of the band. Under the moniker Jeff Lynne's ELO they tour with additional musicians.

History

1968–1986 
In 1968, Roy Wood — guitarist, vocalist and songwriter of the Move — had an idea to form a new band that would use violins, cellos, string basses, horns and woodwinds to give their music a classical sound, allowing rock music to "pick up where the Beatles left off..." in a new direction. The orchestral instruments would be the main focus, rather than the guitars. Jeff Lynne, frontman of fellow Birmingham group The Idle Race, was excited by the concept. When Trevor Burton left the Move in February 1969, Lynne was asked by Wood to join, only to say no, as he was still focused on finding success with his band. But in January 1970, when Carl Wayne quit the band, Lynne accepted Wood's second invitation to join, on the condition that they focus their energy on the new project.

On 12 July 1970, when Wood added multiple cellos to a Lynne-penned song intended to be a Move B-side, the new concept became a reality and "10538 Overture" became the first Electric Light Orchestra song. The original plan was to end The Move following the release of the Looking On album at the end of 1970, crossing over to the new unit in the new year. But to help finance the fledgling band, one further Move album, Message from the Country, was recorded during the lengthy ELO recordings and released in mid-1971. The resulting debut album The Electric Light Orchestra was released in December 1971. Only the trio of Wood, Lynne and Bevan played on all songs, with Bill Hunt supplying the French Horn parts and Steve Woolam playing violin. It was released in the United States in March 1972 as No Answer. The name was chosen after a record company secretary had tried to ring the UK company to get the name of the album. They were unavailable so she left a note reading "No answer". "10538 Overture" became a UK top-ten hit. With both bands' albums in the stores simultaneously, the Move and ELO both appeared on television during this period.

ELO's debut concert took place on 16 April 1972 at the Greyhound Pub in Croydon, Surrey, with a line-up of Wood, Lynne, Bevan, Bill Hunt (keyboards/French horn), Andy Craig (cello), Mike Edwards (cello), Wilfred Gibson (violin), Hugh McDowell (cello), and Richard Tandy (bass). However, this line-up did not last for long. First Craig departed, and then Wood, during the recordings for the band's second LP. Taking Hunt and McDowell with him, Wood left the band to form Wizzard. Both cited problems with their manager, Don Arden, who Wood felt failed in his role, and an unsatisfactory tour of Italy, where the cellos and violins could not be heard over the electric instruments. However, Arden would manage Wizzard, despite Wood's negative comments towards Arden. Despite predictions from the music press that the band would fold without Wood, who had been the driving force behind the creation of ELO, Lynne stepped up to lead the band, with Bevan, Edwards, Gibson and Tandy (who had switched from bass to keyboards to replace Hunt) remaining from the previous line-up, and new recruits Mike de Albuquerque and Colin Walker joining the band on bass and cello, respectively.

The new line-up performed at the 1972 Reading Festival on 12 August 1972. Barcus Berry instrument pick-ups, now sported by the band's string trio, allowed them to have proper amplification on stage for their instruments, which had previously been all but drowned out by the electrified instruments. The band released their second album ELO 2 in early 1973, which produced their second UK top 10 and their first US chart single, an elaborate version of the Chuck Berry classic "Roll Over Beethoven" (which also incorporated the first movement of Beethoven's own Fifth Symphony). ELO also made their first appearance on American Bandstand. During the recording of the third album, Gibson was let go after a dispute over money, Mik Kaminski joined as violinist, and Walker left. Remaining cellist Edwards finished the cello parts for the album. The resulting album, On the Third Day, was released in late 1973, with the American version featuring the popular single "Showdown". After leaving Wizzard, Hugh McDowell returned as the group's second cellist, also in late 1973, in time to appear on the On the Third Day cover in some regions, despite not having played on the album.

For the band's fourth album, Eldorado, a concept album about a daydreamer, Lynne stopped multi-tracking strings and hired Louis Clark as string arranger with an orchestra and choir. ELO's string players still continued to perform on recordings, however. The first single off the album, "Can't Get It Out of My Head", became their first US top 10 hit, and Eldorado, A Symphony became ELO's first gold album. Mike de Albuquerque departed the band during the recording sessions as he wished to spend more time with his family, and consequently much of the bass on the album was performed by Lynne.

1974–1986 
Following the release of Eldorado, Kelly Groucutt was recruited as bassist and in early 1975, Melvyn Gale replaced Edwards on cello. The line-up stabilised as the band took to a decidedly more accessible sound. ELO had become successful in the US at this point and the group was a star attraction on the stadium and arena circuit, and appeared on The Midnight Special more than any other band in that show's history with four appearances (in 1973, 1975, 1976, and 1977).

This line-up continued and released albums Face the Music (1975), A New World Record (1976) and Out of the Blue (1977). In 1981, ELO's sound changed again with the science fiction concept album Time, a throwback to earlier, more progressive rock albums like Eldorado. With the string section now departed, synthesisers took a dominating role, as was the trend in the larger music scene of the time; although studio strings were present on some of the tracks conducted by Rainer Pietsch, The band embarked on their last world tour to promote the LP. For the tour, Kaminski returned to the line-up on violin, whilst Louis Clark (synthesizers) and Dave Morgan (guitar, keyboards, synthesizers, vocals) also joined the on stage lineup. Clark had previously handled string arrangements for the band.

Jeff Lynne wanted to follow Time with a double album, but CBS blocked his plan on the grounds that a double vinyl album would be too expensive in the oil crisis and not sell as well as a single record, so as a result, the new album was edited down to a single disc and released as Secret Messages in 1983; many of the out-takes were later released on Afterglow or as B-sides of singles. The album was a hit in the UK reaching the top 5, but its release was undermined by a string of bad news that there would be no tour to promote the LP.

Drummer Bevan moved on to play drums for Black Sabbath and bassist Groucutt, unhappy with no touring income that year, decided to sue Lynne and Jet Records in November 1983, eventually resulting in a settlement for the sum of £300,000. While Secret Messages debuted at number four in the United Kingdom.

Lynne and Tandy went on to record tracks for the 1984 Electric Dreams soundtrack under Lynne's name; however, Lynne was contractually obliged to make one more ELO album. So Lynne, Bevan and Tandy returned to the studio in 1984 and 1985 as a three-piece (with Christian Schneider playing saxophone on some tracks and Lynne again doubling on bass in addition to his usual guitar in the absence of an official bass player) to record Balance of Power, released early in 1986 after some delays. Though the single "Calling America" placed in the Top 30 in the United Kingdom (number 28) and Top 20 in the States, subsequent singles failed to chart. The album lacked actual classical strings, which were replaced once again by synthesizers, played by Tandy and Lynne. However, despite being a 3-piece, much of the album was made by Lynne alone, with Tandy and Bevan giving their additions later.

The band was then rejoined by Kaminski, Clark and Morgan, adding Martin Smith on bass guitar, and proceeded to perform a small number of live ELO performances in 1986, including shows in England and Germany along with US appearances on American Bandstand, Solid Gold, then at Disneyland that summer. ELO performed at the Heart Beat 86 charity concert organised by Bevan in the band's hometown of Birmingham on 15 March 1986;

2001–present 
Lynne's comeback with ELO began in 2000 with the release of a retrospective box set, Flashback, containing three CDs of remastered tracks and a handful of out-takes and unfinished works, most notably a new version of ELO's only UK number one hit "Xanadu". In 2001 Zoom, ELO's first album since 1986, was released. Though billed and marketed as an ELO album, the only returning member other than Lynne was Tandy, who performed on one track. Guest musicians included former Beatles Ringo Starr and George Harrison. Upon completion of the album, Lynne reformed the band with completely new members, including his then-girlfriend Rosie Vela (who had released her own album, Zazu, in 1986) and announced that ELO would tour again. Tandy rejoined the band a short time afterwards for two television live performances: VH1 Storytellers and a PBS concert shot at CBS Television City, later titled Zoom Tour Live and released on DVD. Besides Lynne, Tandy and Vela, the new live ELO lineup included Gregg Bissonette (drums, backing vocals), Matt Bissonette (bass guitar, backing vocals), Marc Mann (guitars, keyboards, backing vocals), Peggy Baldwin (cello), and Sarah O'Brien (cello). However, the planned tour was cancelled, reportedly due to poor ticket sales.

Lynne and Tandy reunited again on 12 November 2013 to perform, under the name Jeff Lynne and Friends, "Livin' Thing" and "Mr. Blue Sky" at the Children in Need Rocks concert at Hammersmith Eventim Apollo, London. The backing orchestra was the BBC Concert Orchestra, with Chereene Allen on lead violin.

The success of the Children in Need performance was followed by support from BBC Radio 2 DJ Chris Evans, who had Lynne as his on-air guest and asked his listeners if they wanted to see ELO perform. The 50,000 tickets for the resulting BBC Radio 2's "Festival in a Day" in Hyde Park on 14 September 2014 sold out in 15 minutes. Billed as "Jeff Lynne's ELO", Lynne and Tandy were backed by the Take That/Gary Barlow band from the Children in Need concert, led by Mike Stevens and the BBC Concert Orchestra. Lynne chose to use the name as a response to ELO offshoots ELO Part II and The Orchestra. Chereene Allen was again the lead violinist for the band. The development of modern digital processing added a smoother finish to the work, which led Lynne to reconsider his preference for studio work, hinting at a UK tour in 2015.

On 8 February 2015, Jeff Lynne's ELO played at the Grammy Awards for the first time. They performed a medley of "Evil Woman" and "Mr. Blue Sky" with Ed Sheeran, who introduced them as "A man and a band who I love".

On 10 September 2015, it was announced that a new ELO album would be released. The album was to be under the moniker of Jeff Lynne's ELO, with the band signed to Columbia Records. Alone in the Universe was released on 13 November 2015. The album was ELO's first album of new material since 2001's Zoom. The first track, and single, "When I Was a Boy" was made available for streaming on the same day and a music video for the song was also released. A small promotional tour followed the album's release which saw Jeff Lynne's ELO perform a full concert for BBC Radio 2 along with their first two shows in the United States in 30 years, both which sold out very quickly. Jeff Lynne's ELO also made rare US television appearances on The Tonight Show Starring Jimmy Fallon, Jimmy Kimmel Live and CBS This Morning. A 19-date European tour was announced for 2016, with the band playing the Pyramid Stage at Glastonbury Festival on 26 June 2016.

In 2017 they played their "Alone in the Universe" tour. That same year, on 7 April, they played at the Rock and Roll Hall of Fame as they were inducted during the 32nd Annual Induction Ceremony.

The band continued to tour in 2018 in North America and Europe. A video was created for the City of Birmingham which used the original recording of "Mr. Blue Sky" as its music; this was played at the Gold Coast 2018 Commonwealth Games Closing Ceremony during the handover presentation of Birmingham 2022.

On 3 August 2018, Secret Messages was reissued "as originally conceived" as a double album. It included several cut tracks, such as the CD exclusive bonus track "Time After Time", B-side exclusives "Buildings Have Eyes" and "After All", the Afterglow exclusives "Mandalay" and "Hello My Old Friend", and the 2001 reissue exclusives "Endless Lies" and "No Way Out".

On 22 October 2018, Lynne announced that Jeff Lynne's ELO would embark on a 2019 North American tour from June to August 2019.

ELO released their 14th album, From Out of Nowhere, on 1 November 2019. While a tour from the album was announced to begin in October 2020, the official Jeff Lynne's ELO Twitter page then later announced that the tour was cancelled due to the COVID-19 pandemic.

Official members

Current members

Former members

Touring members

Current touring members

Former touring members

Timeline

Touring member timeline

Line-ups

Original ELO Lineups

Jeff Lynne's ELO Lineups

References

External links

Electric Light Orchestra – The official Facebook page by Legacy Recordings.
Electric Light Orchestra Legacy Recordings site – ELO's page at their record label.
Jeff Lynne's ELO – The official Jeff Lynne website.
Face the Music – ELO and related artists information website.
Jeff Lynne Song Database

 
Electric Light Orchestra